Xaxaba Airfield  is an airstrip  west of Xaxaba, a village in the Okavango Delta of Botswana. It serves several safari camps in the area. The runway is just outside the Moremi Game Reserve.

See also

Transport in Botswana
List of airports in Botswana

References

External links
OpenStreetMap - Xaxaba
OurAirports - Xaxaba
SkyVector - Xaxaba
FallingRain - Xaxaba Airport

Lodge at Xaxaba Airfield

Airports in Botswana